Ndumo Game Reserve is a small South African game reserve located in the far northeast district of KwaZulu-Natal known as Maputaland. It is situated on the border with Mozambique where the Pongola River joins the Great Usutu River. It is adjacent to the Tembe Elephant Park.

Ndumo hosts a diverse range of habitats including sand forest, dense riverine forest, floodplains, alluvial plains, reedbeds, grassland, broad-leaved and acacia woodlands and extremely dense thornveld. Ndumo is popular for its birdlife and despite its small size, the reserve has recorded in excess of 430 bird species including residents and seasonal migrants. The park's abundance of pans, floodplains and rivers (Pongola & Usutu) provide suitable habitat for many aquatic species. The Maputaland area in general is relatively rich in birdlife due to ecosystem diversity as well as its geographical location: the area forms the southernmost range for a great many eastern and north-eastern African bird species. The area receives a high annual rainfall.

A short list of sought-after bird species resident to Ndumo:
Pel's fishing owl
Narina trogon
African broadbill
Eastern nicator (formerly "yellow-spotted nicator" but this name is now given to another bird, the western nicator)
African cuckoo-hawk

Large mammals found in Ndumo include nyala, hippopotamus, Nile crocodile, impala and Cape buffalo. Big cats are absent from the park. Elephants are prolific at the neighbouring Tembe Elephant Park.

As with all parts of Maputaland, malaria is endemic and visitors are advised to take the proper precautions.

There is an Ezemvelo KZN Wildlife campsite and hutted camp.

This park is to be included into the: Usuthu-Tembe-Futi Transfrontier Conservation Area.

Displacement of Indigenous Peoples 
In 1924, the area that is now the Ndumo Game Reserve was declared to be a protected area by South Africa. In the 1950s and 60s, the local inhabitants were forcibly evicted from their native lands. Although the Ndumo communities legally contested their right to the land, they were denied the right to resettle the land, instead given financial restitution and (in theory) a say in management. One resident says of this period of time:There we were rich; we ate sweet potatoes, bananas, madumbe [root vegetable], cassava and pumpkins. We drank from the Usuthu River. Today that river is reserved for the hippos and crocodiles while our children die from drought. The wild fruits are left to fatten the monkeys, and the rhinos graze on the graves of our ancestors.

The unresolved dispute over control of this land, and ongoing issues with Community Based Natural Resource Management as a conservation model in the province (Meer 2010), has resulted in the anomalous situation that the eastern part of this declared provincial game reserve is now occupied and farmed by locals. This is despite its status as a Ramsar wetland of international importance, declared in 1997. Farmland is replacing the indigenous vegetation and wildlife, and crocodiles no longer nest along the river.

References

 Meer, T. 2010. Finding the community in community-base natural resource management: the case of Ndumo Game Reserve, South Africa. MA Thesis, Dalhousie University.  
 Wesołowska, W. & Haddad, Ch.R. 2009. Jumping spiders (Araneae: Salticidae) of the Ndumo Game Reserve, Maputaland, South Africa. African Invertebrates 50 (1): 13-103.

External links
 Ezemvelo KZN Wildlife
 Wilderness Safaris

Maputaland coastal forest mosaic
Maputo River
Ezemvelo KZN Wildlife Parks
Ramsar sites in South Africa